Lewis Hall may refer to:

People
Lewis Hall (politician) (1860–1933), English-born dental surgeon and politician
Lewis Hall (soldier) (1895–1943), United States Army soldier
Lewis Hall (footballer) (born 2004), English association footballer

Places
Lewis Hall (Notre Dame), one of the 32 Residence Halls at the University of Notre Dame